An electronic toilet or eToilet is a type of public toilet that is used in India. The increase in use of eToilets is in support of Swachh Bharat Abhiyan (in English, the Clean India Mission) which intends to reduce the practice of open defecation.

eToilets are self-contained, self-cleaning, unisex, user-friendly, unmanned, automated and remotely monitored toilet pods installed in public places. They were developed by a private company, Eram Scientific Solutions, in 2008. Like Sanisette, eToilet is a registered trademark.

Features 

eToilets can be coin operated pay toilets, or freely accessed with manual entry and exit. A safeguard corridor panel serves as a screen to avoid disturbing the public or the user of the toilet. The entire unit is made of stainless steel. Like other self-sustaining, electronic public toilets, eToilets have sensors to initiate automatic functions including pre-flush and post-flush platform cleaning, after a specified number of uses. Indication lights are displayed outside the unit which helps the user to identify whether the facility is occupied (red light) or unoccupied (green light) and whether the facility is out of service, for example if the water supply is low.

See also 
 Sanisette, a registered trademark for a similar toilet
 Self-cleaning floor

References

Further reading
 
 
 
 

Public toilets automation
Toilet types